Antitrichia is a genus of mosses belonging to the family Leucodontaceae with a cosmopolitan distribution.

Species
The following species are recognised in the genus Antitrichia:
 Antitrichia californica Sullivant
 Antitrichia curtipendula Bridel
 Antitrichia kilimandscharica Brotherus
 Antitrichia pseudocalifornia Kindb.

References

Hypnales
Moss genera